Chromeč is a municipality and village in Šumperk District in the Olomouc Region of the Czech Republic. It has about 600 inhabitants.

Geography
It lies in the Mohelnice Depression lowlands. The municipality is situated on the right bank of the Morava River.

History
The first written mention of Chromeč is from 1353, when the recent area was divided into several parts kept by multiple owners. From 1658 until the abolishment of manorialism in 1848, Chromeč was a part of the Bludov manor.

During the World War II, the German occupiers operated the E384 forced labour subcamp of the Stalag VIII-B/344 prisoner-of-war camp in the village.

From 1976 to 1990, Chromeč was an administrative part of Bludov. The municipality became autonomous on 24 November 1990.

Sights
The landmark of Chromeč is the Church of Saint John of Nepomuk.

Notable people
Josef Drásal (1841–1886), the tallest Czech ever

References

External links

Villages in Šumperk District